Risto Kala (24 July 1941 – 25 November 2021) was a Finnish basketball player. He competed in the men's tournament at the 1964 Summer Olympics. Kala was SM-sarja top scorer in 1968–1969 season. Representing Pantterit he won two Finnish championships. In 2018, Kala was inducted to Finnish Basketball Hall of Fame. Kala died in November 2021, at the age of 80.

References

External links
 

1941 births
2021 deaths
Basketball players at the 1964 Summer Olympics
Finnish men's basketball players
Olympic basketball players of Finland
Sportspeople from Helsinki